Kevin Raúl Lara Herrera (born 18 April 1998) is a Mexican professional footballer who plays as a winger for Liga de Expansión MX team Pumas Tabasco, on loan from UNAM.

International career
Lara was called up for the 2017 FIFA U-20 World Cup.

Honours
Tampico Madero
Liga de Expansión MX: Guard1anes 2020

Mexico U17
CONCACAF U-17 Championship: 2015

References

External links
Kevin Lara at Soccerway 
Kevin Lara at Sofascore 

1998 births
Living people
Mexican footballers
Mexico under-20 international footballers
Footballers from Sinaloa
Sportspeople from Culiacán
Tampico Madero F.C. footballers
Atlético San Luis footballers
Liga MX players
Association football midfielders